Cungšan (sometimes written as 董山) was a chieftain of the Jurchen Jianzhou Left Guard. Cungšan was the great-great-great-grandfather of Nurhaci, the founder of the Later Jin dynasty of China. His posthumous name was Emperor Chun. His father was Mengtemu.

In 1442, a succession dispute between Cungšan and his half-brother Fanca led to a division in the Jianzhou Left Guard. Cungšan inherited his father's position as head of the Jianzhou Left Guard while his brother Fanca was made head of a new separate Jianzhou Right Guard by the Ming dynasty. After the death of his half-brother Fanca, Cungšan brought the Right Guard under his control.

Family
Children: 
 Tolo
 Toimo
 Sibeoci Fiyanggū

References

Jurchens in Ming dynasty
15th-century Chinese people